Van Montfoort is a surname.  Notable people with the surname include:

 Anthonie Blocklandt van Montfoort (1533/1534–1583), Dutch painter
 Jan III van Montfoort ( 1448–1522), Dutch noble

Surnames of Dutch origin